Nicola Testi (born 6 June 1986) is an Italian cyclist.

Major results
2012
 4th Trofeo Edil C
 6th Ronde Van Vlaanderen U23

References

1990 births
Living people
Italian male cyclists
Cyclists from Tuscany
Sportspeople from the Province of Arezzo